is a Japanese festival celebrated from 7 to 9 September in Kakunodate, Akita. Its rites centre on Shinmei-sha shrine. As well as a procession and traditional dances, it is celebrated for the oyamabayashi in which the floats collide into each other. It has a 350-year history, and in 1991 was designated an Important Intangible Folk Cultural Property.

See also
Matsuri
List of Important Intangible Folk Cultural Properties
Important Intangible Cultural Properties of Japan

References

Festivals in Akita Prefecture
Important Intangible Folk Cultural Properties
Semboku, Akita